Akim Arrondell (born 3 November 1999) is a Saint-Martinois footballer who currently plays for FC Soualiga of the Sint Maarten Senior League, and the Saint Martin national team.

Club career
Arrondell was a member of Junior Stars FC beginning in at least 2013. Following the 2013–2014 season he was one of three nominees for Saint Martin's Footballer-of-the-Year Award. In 2019 he moved to FC Soualiga of the Senior League on the Dutch side of the island.

International career
Arrondell was part of Saint Martin's roster that competed at the 2013 CONCACAF Under-15 Championship. He made his senior international debut on 26 August 2018 in a friendly against Anguilla. He went on to score his first two senior international goals in the eventual 2–1 victory. Later that year he made five appearances for Saint Martin during the 2018 CONCACAF U-20 Championship, scoring one goal in the team's opening 1–1 draw with Aruba. He scored four goals against Sint Maarten in his country's final training match before the tournament. Prior to 2019–20 CONCACAF Nations League qualification Saint Martin played an unofficial friendly against Saint Barthélemy. Arrondell scored his team's final goal of the 3–4 defeat. He went on to score in the Nations League qualifying campaign against Sint Maarten.

International goals
Scores and results list Saint Martin's goal tally first.

International career statistics

References

External links

Saint Martinois footballers
Saint Martin international footballers
Association football midfielders
1999 births
Living people